In Old California is a 1942 American Western film directed by William C. McGann starring John Wayne, Binnie Barnes and Albert Dekker. Wayne plays Tom Craig, a Boston pharmacist who relocates to Sacramento during the Gold Rush.

Plot
Tom Craig (John Wayne), a pharmacist, arrives in Sacramento and gets into trouble with Britt Dawson (Albert Dekker) for carrying Lacey Miller (Binnie Barnes) across a mud puddle. Tom teams up with Kegs (Edgar Kennedy) and they are thrown off the river boat by Britt’s henchmen. Tom strikes a deal with Lacey to sell his pharmaceuticals in her store. Ellen Sanford (Helen Parrish) and Tom begin a romance. Tom and Kegs organize the settlers to stop Dawson’s land-grabbing gang. Tom proposes to Ellen as she leaves for San Francisco. Helga (Patsy Kelly), Lacey's lady's maid, gun in hand, marches Kegs off to get married.  Whitey (Emmett Lynn), the town drunk, drinks Tom’s elixir tonic, which Dawson has poisoned, and dies in Tom’s store. The townspeople take Tom out to hang him, but he is saved when gold is discovered. Dawson shoots up Tom’s store, they fight, and Tom ends up in jail.

Lacey leaves Britt for the gold miners who are suffering from typhoid fever.  Tom leaves Ellen, loads up medicine and with the townspeople depart for the gold fields. Britt and his brother Joe (Dick Purcell) plan to ambush the townspeople to steal the medicine. Joe shoots Britt and attacks the townspeople but Britt, who is only wounded, shoots Joe. Tom and the townspeople make it to the miners camp, thus saving them. Britt admits to poisoning Tom's elixir and dies. Back in town Tom and Lacey reunite.

Cast
 John Wayne as Tom Craig
 Binnie Barnes as Lacey Miller
 Albert Dekker as Britt Dawson
 Helen Parrish as Ellen Sanford
 Patsy Kelly as Helga
 Edgar Kennedy as Kegs McKeever
 Dick Purcell as Joe Dawson
 Harry Shannon as Mr. Carlin
 Charles Halton as Mr. Hayes
 Emmett Lynn as Whitey
 Robert McKenzie as Mr. Bates (as Bob McKenzie)
 Milton Kibbee as Ezra Tompkins (as Milt Kibbee)
 Paul Sutton as Chick – Dawson's stooge
 Anne O'Neal as Mrs. Tompkins

See also
 John Wayne filmography

References

External links

 
 
 
 Review at The New York Times 

1942 films
1942 Western (genre) films
American black-and-white films
American Western (genre) films
Republic Pictures films
Films directed by William C. McGann
Films produced by Robert North
Films scored by David Buttolph
1940s English-language films
1940s American films